In mathematics, a Hilbert–Schmidt integral operator is a type of integral transform. Specifically, given a domain (an open and connected set) Ω in n-dimensional Euclidean space Rn, a Hilbert–Schmidt kernel is a function k : Ω × Ω → C with

(that is, the L2(Ω×Ω; C) norm of k is finite), and the associated Hilbert–Schmidt integral operator is the operator K : L2(Ω; C) → L2(Ω; C) given by

Then K is a Hilbert–Schmidt operator with Hilbert–Schmidt norm

Hilbert–Schmidt integral operators are both continuous (and hence bounded) and compact (as with all Hilbert–Schmidt operators).

The concept of a Hilbert–Schmidt operator may be extended to any locally compact Hausdorff spaces. Specifically, let X be a locally compact Hausdorff space equipped with a positive Borel measure. Suppose further that L2(X) is a separable Hilbert space. The above condition on the kernel k on Rn can be interpreted as demanding k belong to L2(X × X). Then the operator

is compact. If 

then K is also self-adjoint and so the spectral theorem applies. This is one of the fundamental constructions of such operators, which often reduces problems about infinite-dimensional vector spaces to questions about well-understood finite-dimensional eigenspaces. See Chapter 2 of the book by Bump in the references for examples.

See also 

 Hilbert–Schmidt operator

References

  (Sections 8.1 and 8.5)

 

Linear operators
Operator theory